Aoraki / Mount Cook, formerly named just as Mount Cook, is the highest mountain in New Zealand.

Mount Cook may also refer to:

 Mount Cook Village, the settlement at the base of the New Zealand mountain
 Aoraki / Mount Cook National Park, the National Park including the mountain and its surrounds
 Mount Cook Airline, a regional New Zealand airline
 Mount Cook Group, a former New Zealand transport and tourism company
 Mount Cook of rivers, nickname for the Waitaha River in Westland, New Zealand
 Mount Cook (Antarctica)
 Mount Cook (Saint Elias Mountains) in Canada/USA
 Mount Cook, Wellington, a suburb of Wellington, New Zealand
 Mount Cook near Cooktown, Queensland, Australia

See also
 Mount Cooke (Western Australia)